Pedro Gómez Carmona (born 7 June 1982) is a Spanish professional football manager. His current club is Al-Wasl of the Reserve UAE Pro-League.

Career 
Born in Vitoria-Gasteiz, Álava, Spain, Carmona began his career in with Getafe CF's youth setup. In 2005, he was appointed assistant manager of Tercera División side CF Pozuelo de Alarcón.

In 2010 Carmona accepted an offer to join Saudi Arabian Al-Hilal FC's coaching staff. That season, the team won the King's Cup and the Saudi Professional League, the latter undefeated.

In November 2011, Carmona was named Gabriel Calderón's assistant at Baniyas SC. The club reached the semifinals of the UAE President's Cup and the Round of 16 of the AFC Champions League, repeating the best outcome of an Emirati club in the latter competition.

Carmona remained as Calderón's second in the following years, at Bahrain national football team, Real Betis and Al-Wasl FC. On 24 February 2016, he joined Valencia CF's technical staff.

On 12 December 2016, Carmona was appointed manager of Primeira Liga's G.D. Estoril Praia. Under his guidance, the club reached the semifinals of the Taça de Portugal for the first time in seventy-three years; on 8 March 2017, however, he was sacked.

On 5 January 2018, Carmona was appointed Real Murcia's director of football. Dismissed on 20 March, he was appointed at the helm of Bahraini Premier League side East Riffa Club on 8 June.

In his sole season in the Middle East, Carmona guided East Riffa to the best start in the league's history, in addition to winning the FA Cup. He left in May 2019, seeking new challenges.

In October 2020 he returns as an assistant to the Emirati team of Al-Wasl in Dubai, awarded by the International Federation of Football History and Statistics as the best club of the 20th century in their country. In March 2021 he renews with the club until June 2023 and, in addition, he is appointed head coach of the reserve team.

Milestones 
 Champion of the Federation Cup of Bahrain (2019) with the East Riffa Club.
 Runner-up in the UAE President's Cup (2012) with Baniyas Sport Club.
 Saudi Arabian Pro League Champion (2011) with Al Hilal Saudí Football Club.
 Champion of the Crown Prince Cup of Saudi Arabia (2011) with Al Hilal Saudí Football Club.

References

External links
 

1982 births
Living people
People from Vitoria-Gasteiz
Spanish football managers
Primeira Liga managers
G.D. Estoril Praia managers
East Riffa Club managers
Spanish expatriate football managers
Spanish expatriate sportspeople in Portugal
Expatriate football managers in Portugal
Expatriate football managers in Bahrain